The following is a list of cast members who have appeared in the Brazilian semi-reality television programme De Férias com o Ex.

Cast
Bold indicates original cast member; all other cast were brought into the series as an ex.

  Ages at the time the cast member appeared in the series
 Key:  = "Cast member" returns to the beach for the second time.
 Key:  = "Cast member" returns to the beach for the third time.

Duration of cast
 Key:  = "Cast member" is featured in this episode.
 Key:  = "Cast member" arrives on the beach.
 Key:  = "Cast member" has an ex arrive on the beach.
 Key:  = "Cast member" has two exes arrive on the beach.
 Key:  = "Cast member" arrives on the beach and has an ex arrive during the same episode.
 Key:  = "Cast member" leaves the beach.
 Key:  = "Cast member" has an ex arrive on the beach and leaves during the same episode.
 Key:  = "Cast member" arrives on the beach and leaves during the same episode.
 Key:  = "Cast member" does not feature in this episode.

Season 1

Season 2

Season 3

Season 4

Season 5

Season 6

Season 7

References

De Férias com o Ex cast members
Ex on the Beach